Nicolas Mahut won the title, defeating Gilles Müller 7–6(7–4), 6–4 in the final.

Seeds

Draw

Finals

Top half

Bottom half

References
 Main Draw
 Qualifying Draw

Valle d'Aosta Open - Singles
Sport in Courmayeur